Hammoud or Hamoud or Hamud (in Arabic حمود) may refer to:

Places
Hamud, a village in Angali Rural District, in the Central District of Bushehr County, Bushehr Province, Iran
Bourj Hammoud (or Burj Hammud), a suburb in North-East Beirut, Lebanon in the Metn district heavily populated by Lebanese Armenians
Qaleh Hamud, a village in Jayezan Rural District, Jayezan District, Omidiyeh County, Khuzestan Province, Iran
Sultan Hamud, town in Kasikeu division of Nzaui District of Eastern Province, Kenya

People

Given name
Hamoud Ameur (born 1932), French long-distance runner, Olympian
Hamoud al Aqla al Shuebi (died 2001), Saudi Islamic cleric
Hamoud Al-Dalhami (born 1971), Omani sprinter
Hamoud al-Gayifi (1918–1985), Prime Minister of the Yemen Arab Republic serving 1964 to 1965 under President Abdullah as-Sallal
Hamoud al-Hitar (born c. 1955), Yemeni judge
Hamoud Jumaa (born 1970), Tanzanian politician, MP  
Hamoud Muhammed Ou'bad, Yemeni politician and government minister
Hamoud Al-Saadi (born 1992), Omani football player 
Hamoud Al-Shemmari (born 1960), Kuwaiti football player

Middle name
Ali bin Hamud of Zanzibar (1884–1918), Sultan of Zanzibar
Saud Hamoud 'Abid al-Qatini al-'Otaibi (1971–2005), leader of Al-Qaeda in the Arabian Peninsula

Surname 
Abdullah Hammoud, Lebanese-American Michigan State Representative for the 15th District
Ali Hammoud (born 1944), Syrian politician
Assem Hammoud (born 1975), alleged Al Qaeda operative
Fadwa Hammoud, American lawyer
Jeff Hammoud, Lebanese-Canadian car designer
Mahmoud Hammoud (1935-2018), Lebanese politician and diplomat
Mahmoud Hammoud (born 1964), Lebanese football player and manager
Mohamad Hamoud (born 1987), Lebanese football player
Mounir Hamoud (born 1985), Norwegian football player of Moroccan descent

Other uses 
Hamoud Boualem, Algerian soft drink manufacturing company

See also
Hammouda, a name